Chalastra ochrea is a moth of the family Geometridae. It is endemic to New Zealand. It has been observed in both the North and South Islands and inhabits native forest. Larvae of C. ochrea feed on the leaves of species in the genus Sophora including Sophora chathamica. Adults are on the wing from February until April. They have been collected via sugar traps.

Taxonomy
It was first described by George Howes in 1911 from specimens collected at Woodhaugh Gardens in Dunedin in February and April and named Selidosema ochrea. In 1919 Edward Meyrick, thinking he was describing a new species, named this species Selidosema prototoxa. George Hudson described and illustrated S. ochrea in his 1928 book The butterflies and moths of New Zealand. In 1988 John S. Dugdale placed this species in the genus Chalastra. He placed this species in that genus as it was included by Meyrick in Selidosema, and had "a reduced, rounded uncus and no spinose process on the disc of the valva". In the same publication Dugdale synonymised Selidosema prototoxa with C. ochrea as he argued that the genitalia were indistinguishable between specimens of S. prototoxa and C. ochrea. He also argued that the specimens in the New Zealand Arthropod Collection showed intergradation of the two colour forms. This placement and synonimising was accepted in the New Zealand Inventory of Biodiversity. The male holotype specimen is held at the Natural History Museum, London.

Description

The larvae of this species is brown coloured with distinctive markings. 

Hudson described the species as follows:

Distribution
This species is endemic to New Zealand. Along with the type locality in Dunedin this species has also been observed in the Canterbury region as well as around the Wairarapa region and in the Central Hawke's Bay District.

Habitat 
This species inhabits native forest.

Behaviour
The adults of this species have been collected via sugar traps. They are on the wing from February until April.

Host plants

Larvae of C. ochrea feed on the leaves of species in the genus Sophora including Sophora chathamica.

References

Moths described in 1911
Moths of New Zealand
Cidariini
Endemic fauna of New Zealand
Taxa named by George Howes (entomologist)
Endemic moths of New Zealand